Nancy Ellen Walls Carell (born July 19, 1966) is an American actress, comedian, and writer best known for her work on Saturday Night Live, The Daily Show and The Office. In 2016, she co-created the TBS comedy series Angie Tribeca with her husband, Steve Carell.

Early life and education
Nancy was born and raised in Cohasset, Massachusetts. She graduated from Boston College in 1988. As a college student, she was a member of the improvisational troupe "My Mother's Fleabag."

Career
Nancy got her start in comedy at The Second City in Chicago and, like many of the troupe's alumni, went on to join the cast of Saturday Night Live (1995–96), where she was best known for her impression of CNN anchor Bobbie Battista. She later held a correspondent position on the satirical TV news program The Daily Show. She voiced the character of Helen Goode on the Mike Judge-created animated series The Goode Family on ABC, where she was credited for the first time as Nancy Carell instead of Nancy Walls. Carell occasionally guest-starred on The Office, which starred her husband, Steve Carell, until 2011, as Carol Stills, a real estate agent and former girlfriend of her husband's character, Michael Scott. She also had a brief appearance in the movie Bridesmaids.

Nancy and her husband, Steve, created the TBS comedy series Angie Tribeca starring Rashida Jones. The series premiered on January 17, 2016.

Personal life
Nancy is married to actor and comedian Steve Carell, whom she met when she was a student in an improvisation class he was teaching at Second City. They have two children, Elisabeth and John.

Filmography
 Saturday Night Live as herself/Various (1995–1996) (20 episodes)
 The Daily Show as Correspondent (1999–2002) (90 episodes)
 Anger Management as Flight Attendant (2003) 
 The 40-Year-Old Virgin as Health Clinic Counselor (2005)
 The Office as Carol Stills (2005–2006, 2010, 2013) (7 episodes)
 The Goode Family as Helen Goode (2009) (13 episodes)
 Bridesmaids as Helen's tennis partner (2011)
 Seeking a Friend for the End of the World as Linda Petersen (2012)
 Angie Tribeca (2017) as Katie Perry (2 episodes)

References

External links
 

1966 births
Living people
People from Cohasset, Massachusetts
Actresses from Massachusetts
American film actresses
American television actresses
Television producers from Massachusetts
American women television producers
American television writers
Boston College alumni
American women comedians
20th-century American actresses
21st-century American actresses
American sketch comedians
Comedians from Massachusetts
Screenwriters from Massachusetts
20th-century American comedians
21st-century American comedians
American women television writers